The 1978 Singaporean presidential election was held to elect the next president of Singapore. Benjamin Sheares was  re-elected by the Parliament of Singapore.

A total of 59 members of Parliament were present at the election while nine members were absent.

Sheares was sworn in for his third term as president on 30 December 1978.

Results

References

Presidential elections in Singapore
Singapore
Presidential election